The Know-How of Face Transplantation is a college-level textbook edited by Maria Siemionow that is 493 pages long. It was published in 2011 by Springer Publishing. Siemionow performed the first near-full face transplant in the United States, which is still extremely rare. Siemionow says that "30 have been done around the world."

About the book
The textbook The Know-How of Face Transplantation was written and published in 2011. The book is divided into six sections:
 Preclinical Approaches to Face Transplantation
 Clinical Aspects in Preparation to Face Transplantation in Humans
 Approval Process of Face Transplantation in Humans
 Social and Public Relations in Face Transplantation
 World Experience with Face Transplantation in Humans
 Future Directions in Face Transplantation

Contributors
The Know-How of Face Transplantation has 71 contributors from the medical, dental and other scientific fields. These contributors include:

George J. Agich, Ph.D.
Selman Altuntas, M.D.
Medhat Askar, M.D., Ph.D.
Anthony Atala, M.D.
Robin Avery, M.D., FIDSA
Rolf N. Barth, M.D.
Stephen T. Bartlett, M.D.
Wilma F. Bergfeld, M.D., FAAD
Steven Bernard, M.D.
Marino Blanes, M.D., Ph.D.
Gordon R. Bowen
Katrina A. Bramstedt, Ph.D.
Grzegorz Brzezicki, M.D.
Federico Castro, M.D.
Pedro C. Cavadas, M.D., Ph.D.
Linda C. Cendales, M.D.
Kathy L. Coffman, M.D., FAPM
Joanna Cwykiel, M.Sc.
Jacek B. Cywinski, M.D.
Pamela L. Dixon, MOT, OTR/L
Risal Djohan, M.D.
Mathieu Domalain, Ph.D.
D. John Doyle, M.D., Ph.D.
Bijan Eghtesad, M.D.
Ann Marie Flores, P.T., Ph.D., CLT
John J. Fung, M.D., Ph.D.
James R. Gatherwright, M.D.
Bahar Bassiri Gharb, M.D., FEBOPRAS
Alexandra K. Glazier, J.D., M.P.H.
Chad R. Gordon, D.O.
Lawrence J. Gottlich, M.D., FACS
Robert G. Hale, D.D.S., COL US Army Dental Corps
Charles Heald
Michael L. Huband, D.D.S.
Helen G. Hui-Chou, M.D.
Javier Ibañez Mata
Luke S. Jones, B.S.
Jean Kanitakis, M.D.
Angela Kiska
Aleksandra Klimezak, Ph.D.
Yur-Ren Kuo, M.D., Ph.D., FACS
Krzystof Kusza, M.D., Ph.D., D.Sc.
Luis Landin, M.D.
Daniel J. Lebovitz, M.D.
Vernon W.-H. Lin, M.D., Ph.D.
Robert F. Lohman, M.D.
Maria Madajka, Ph.D.
Amanda Mendiola, M.D.
Gerhard S. Mundinger, M.D.
Can Ozturk, M.D.
Frank Papy, M.D., FACS, FAAP
Palmina Petruzzo, M.D.
Marc J Popovich, M.D., FCCM
Antonio Rampazzo, M.D., FEBOPRAS
Russell R. Reid, M.D., Ph.D.
Jose Rodrigo, M.D.
Eduardo D. Rodriguez, M.D., D.D.S.
Elliott H. Rose, M.D.
Eileen M. Sheil
Steven T. Shipley, DVM, DACLAM
Maria Z. Siemionow, M.D., Ph.D., D.Sc.
Vlodek Siemionow, Ph.D.
Angela Sirigu, Ph.D.
Erhan Sonmez, M.D., Ph.D.
Jason S. Stratton, M.D.
Alessandro Thione, M.D., Ph.D.
Claudia D. Vargas
Tracy Wheeler
Tsung-Lin Yang, M.D., Ph.D.
James J. Yoo, M.D., Ph.D.
Jose Maria Zarzalejos Andes, M.D.
Xiaoming Zhang, Ph.D.
Faith Zor, M.D.

References

Medical books